Private Communications Technology (PCT) 1.0 was a protocol developed by Microsoft in the mid-1990s. PCT was designed to address security flaws in version 2.0 of Netscape's Secure Sockets Layer protocol and to force Netscape to hand control of the then-proprietary SSL protocol to an open standards body.

PCT has since been superseded by SSLv3 and Transport Layer Security. For a while it was still supported by Internet Explorer, but PCT 1.0 has been disabled by default since IE 5 and the option was removed in IE6. It is still found in IIS and in the Windows operating system libraries, although in Windows Server 2003 it is disabled by default. It is used by old versions of MSMQ as the only choice.

Due to its near disuse, it is arguably a security risk, as it has received less attention in testing than commonly used protocols, and there is little incentive for Microsoft to expend effort on maintaining its implementation of it.

References

External links
 The Private Communication Technology (PCT) Protocol (published 1995)

Cryptographic protocols
Obsolete technologies